Channing Independent School District is a public school district based in Channing, Texas (USA).   The district serves southern and western portions of Hartley County as well as northern Oldham County.

Channing ISD has one school, Channing School, that serves students in grades kindergarten through twelve. Classified as a 1A school by the UIL, it is located in southeastern Hartley County.

In 2009, the school district was rated "recognized" by the Texas Education Agency.

In 2015, the school was rated "Met Standard" by the Texas Education Agency.

History
The district changed to a four day school week in fall 2022.

Athletics
The Channing Eagles compete in these sports - 

Cross Country, Basketball, Golf, Tennis, Track

State Titles
One Act Play 
1978(B), 1979(B), 2006(1A)

References

External links
 

School districts in Hartley County, Texas
School districts in Oldham County, Texas
Public K-12 schools in Texas
Schools in Hartley County, Texas